Álmosd is a village in Hajdú-Bihar county, in the Northern Great Plain region of eastern Hungary.

History

The Jewish community
Jews began to settle in the village in 1770.
In 1830, the Jewish community established a synagogue and a cemetery.

In 1944, 63 Jews lived there, and after the German army entered Hungary, the local Jews were transferred to the Naguivarad ghetto, where all the Jewish residents of the district were concentrated. A few weeks later, they were deported to the Auschwitz extermination camp.

After the war, only a few Jews returned to the village who had survived and community life did not resume. There have been no Jews in the place since 1950.

Geography

References

External links
Aerialphotgraphs of Álmosd

Populated places in Hajdú-Bihar County
Jewish communities destroyed in the Holocaust